Fadahunsi Francis Adenigba (born 12 July 1952) is a retired custom officer and a Nigerian senator representing Osun East constituency in the National Assembly's House of Senate.

He was born in Ilase-Ijesa in Osun State on 12 July 1952 to Late Chief Israel Adekunbi Fadahunsi and Chief (Mrs.) Emily Fadahunsi, both indigenes of Ilase-Ijesa.

Fadahunsi received his primary education in Saint Paul's Anglican Primary school, Ilase-Ijesa and then proceeded to have his secondary education at Abebeyin Anglican Modern School, Atakumosa West Local Government Area in 1964.

References 

1952 births
Nigerian politicians
Living people